Iliana Rocha is an American poet and writer from Texas. Her debut collection, Karankawa (2015), won an AWP Donald Hall Prize for Poetry and a Society of Midland Authors Award.

Iliana Rocha's work has been featured in Best American Poetry online, as well as the Nation, VQR, Blackbird, and Waxwing.

Career 
Rocha earned her MFA in poetry from Arizona State University, where she was poetry editor for Hayden’s Ferry Review. She taught composition and rhetoric at Arizona State and developmental writing at South Mountain Community College. Rocha earned a PhD in English and creative writing at Western Michigan University. 

Rocha is currently assistant professor of creative writing at the University of Central Oklahoma.

Publications 
Karankawa, University of Pittsburgh Press, 2015.

References

External links 
 Iliana Rocha profile at The Poetry Foundation

Year of birth missing (living people)
Living people
21st-century American poets
Arizona State University alumni
Western Michigan University alumni
University of Central Oklahoma faculty